Eugen is a masculine given name. It may also refer to:

 Christoph Eugen (born 1976), Austrian Nordic combined skier
 Eugen Systems, a French video game developer
 European Geology Students Network (EUGEN), a German youth organization

See also
 German cruiser Prinz Eugen, German World War II heavy cruiser
 , Austrian and Austro-Hungarian Navy ships